Aragonese Nobility (Spanish: Nobleza baturra) is a 1965 Spanish musical film directed by Juan de Orduña. It is a remake of the 1935 film Nobleza baturra.

Cast
 Manuel Arbó 
 Pedro Azorín 
 Joaquín Bergía 
 Julia Caba Alba 
 Antonio Canal 
 Alfonso de Córdoba
 Julia Delgado Caro 
 Irán Eory as María del Pilar 
 Margarita Esteban 
 Alfredo Landa as Perico  
 Miguel Ligero as Padre Juanico  
 José Moreno as Marco  
 Elisa Méndez 
 Luis Orduña
 Vicente Parra as Sebastián  
 Mary Paz Pondal as Andrea  
 Roberto Rey 
 Antonio Taño 
 Elena María Tejeiro

References

Bibliography 
 Mira, Alberto. Historical Dictionary of Spanish Cinema. Scarecrow Press, 2010.

External links 
 

1965 films
1965 musical films
Spanish musical films
1960s Spanish-language films
Films directed by Juan de Orduña
1960s Spanish films